The Bundesstraße 26 or Federal Highway 26, (abbreviation: B 26) runs between the city of  Riedstadt at the B44, to the city of  Hallstadt, at the Bundesautobahn 70, A70 in Germany. The highway run East to West. It crosses the River Main and the Mannheim–Frankfurt railway.

The highway runs through (West to East): Riedstadt, Griesheim, Darmstadt, Dieburg, Münster, Hesse, Babenhausen, Großostheim, Aschaffenburg, Goldbach, Bavaria, Hösbach, Laufach, Rechtenbach, Lohr, Gemünden am Main, Karlstadt am Main, Arnstein, Werneck, Bergrheinfeld, Schweinfurt, Schonungen, Theres, Haßfurt, Zeil am Main, Ebelsbach, Eltmann, Viereth-Trunstadt, Bischberg and Hallstadt.

Just west of Darmstadt the B26 crosses the Bundesautobahn 5 and Bundesautobahn 67, known as the Darmstädter Kreuz (Darmstadt cross).

Until the changing of Luisenplatz (Luis Square) in Darmstadt into pedestrian zone in the 1970s, the B26 road ran through center Darmstadt. In Darmstadt the B26 meets the North-South Highway of Bundesstraße 3, B3. Today, the B26 pass under the Darmstadt city center.

North eastern bypass Darmstadt
As a replacement for the crossing of the Darmstadt city center, a north eastern bypass is planned. It should relieve the downtown area from car and truck traffic. The planned route was to connect the Darmstadt Ostbahnhof and the Martin-Luther-King-ring. Half of this new road will run in a tunnel.

 Near Schonungen the B26 crosses the Bundesstraße 303. Near Bergrheinfeld the B26 cross the A70. Near Gemünden am Main the B26 crosses the Bundesautobahn 7. In the town of Karlstadt am Main the B26 cross the Bundesstraße 27. In Aschaffenburg the B26 cross the Bundesautobahn 3. In Dieburg the B26 crosses the Bundesstraße 45.

See also 
 Autobahn
 Bundesstraße
 List of federal highways in Germany

References

 A. Kurt: Zur Geschichte von Straßen und Verkehr im Land zwischen Rhein und Main. Dissertation an der Universität Frankfurt 1956.
 Hans-Peter Schäfer: Die Entwicklung des Straßennetzes im Raum Schweinfurt bis zur Mitte des 19. Jh. Würzburg 1976.
 Information on city of Darmstadt on the north eastern bypass
 State Building Authority Wuerzburg B 26n, highway development axis Western MainFranken

Darmstadt
Roads in Hesse
003